Clanoneurum is a genus of shore flies in the family Ephydridae.

Species
C. americanum Cresson, 1940 
C. cimiciforme (Haliday, 1855)
C. menozzii Séguy, 1929
C. orientale Hendel, 1913

References

Ephydridae
Taxa named by Theodor Becker
Diptera of North America
Diptera of Europe
Diptera of Asia
Brachycera genera